Youssef Hourany (1931 – 19 October 2019) was a Lebanese writer, archeologist and historian. Hourany received his diploma in philosophy, from the Lebanese University, and his PhD on the ancient philosophy of history from The Université Saint-Esprit de Kaslik.

Hourany taught ancient history in the Université Saint-Esprit de Kaslik from 1970 to 1977, and from 1977 to 1995 he taught philosophy and archeology in the Lebanese University, then he retired with professor grade. He kept writing books and publishing research until 2017.

Family

Hourany had five children: Monique, Dominique, Marwan, Dania and Lotof.

Bibliography 
Books Published in Arabic
 Man is not a Crowd, Al Hayat Library, Beirut 1956
 Man and Civilization (Introduction, 2nd ed., Al Assriyat Library, Saida 1973
 Lebanon in the Value of its History (Phoenician Era), 2nd ed., An-Nahar Publishing House, Beirut 1992
 Mentality Structure of The Ancient Civilizations in the Mediterranean East, end ed., An-Nahar Publishing House, Beirut 1992
 Ethics of Wisdom in the Babylonian Cultural Heritage, An-Nahar Publishing House, Beirut 1994
 Cana of Galilee in South Lebanon, (Arabic, English & French), ed. By Ministry of Tourism, Beirut 1994
 The Unknown and the Neglected History of South Lebanon, ed. Al Hadatha, Beirut 1999
 The unknown History of the Phoenicians through Philon of Byblos and Sanchoniathon of Beirut, ed. Assakafa Publishing House, Beirut 1999
 The Epic of Beirut Maymoonat, of the Poet Nonnus, Assakafa Publishing House, Beirut 1999
 Heritage from Lebanon, ed. Al Hadatha, Beirut 2003
 Unknown Chapters of Arabs’ History and Language, ed. Al Hadatha, Beirut 2010
 Historical readings to meditate ed. Al-hadatha Beirut 2011

Research
 Discovery of Yarmouta, an ancient Phoenician city that disappeared off the coast of today's Lebanon some 3,300 years ago.
 Jabal 'Amelat The History Through Eponyms In South Lebanon B.C.

References

External links
main website: http://www.youssefhourani.blog.com

1931 births
2019 deaths
20th-century Lebanese historians
21st-century Lebanese historians
Historians of the Middle East
Academic staff of Lebanese University
Lebanese University alumni